Turan's goby (Ponticola turani) is a Ponto-Caspian species of goby endemic fish native to Turkey where it is only found in the Aksu Deresi stream.  This species is found in a fresh water stream with a substrate of rounded pebbles.  Males of this species can reach a length of  SL while females only reach  SL.

The fish is named after Turkish biologist, Dr. Davut Turan.

References 

Turan's goby
Endemic fauna of Turkey
Freshwater fish of Turkey
Taxa named by Semih Engin
Turan's goby